Live From the Short Attention Span Audio Theater Tour!! is a live album by Kid Koala. It was recorded at Lock 17 in London in November 2003.

The album contains two discs - a CD and a DVD - and includes a bingo card.
It was recorded live on a tour of his previous album, Some of My Best Friends Are DJs and his graphic novel, Nufonia Must Fall.

San was backed up by P-Love and DJ Jester The Filipino Fist on the tour and live gigs featured turntablism, comedy, animations and bingo.:

Track listing
 "Stompin At Le Savoi"
 "Page 275"
 "Drunk Trumpet"
 "Skanky Panky"
 "Page 298"

The DVD contains the DJs performing the five tracks from the audio CD plus extras including a "random bingo image generator" and music videos featuring animations by Monkmus:
 "Tremors"
 "Knife In Back"
 "Birdhead"
 "Basin Street Blues"

References

Kid Koala albums
2005 live albums
2005 video albums
Live video albums
Ninja Tune live albums